The 1982 Nations motorcycle Grand Prix was the fifth race of the 1982 Grand Prix motorcycle racing season. It took place on the weekend of 28–30 May 1982 at the Circuito Internazionale Santa Monica.

Classification

500 cc

References

Italian motorcycle Grand Prix
Italian
Motorcycle